World Challenge may refer to:
IAAF World Challenge Meetings
World Challenge Expeditions, an outdoor education company
World Challenge (golf), an offseason golf tournament
GT World Challenge, Continental auto racing series
SWAT World Challenge, annual competition of law enforcement SWAT teams
The World Challenge, competition to solve with social, environmental and community problems
World Club Challenge, an annual rugby league competition
World Football Challenge, an exhibitional international club association football competition featuring football clubs from Europe and North America, which has been held since the summer of 2009.